Douglas Richmond Bell (4 November 1908 – 19 October 1944) was an English track and field athlete who competed in the 1934 British Empire Games.

At the 1934 Empire Games he won the silver medal in the discus throw event and finished fifth in the hammer throw competition.

Captain Bell died in service with the York and Lancaster Regiment in World War II

References

commonwealthgames.com results
Douglas Bell's grave 

1908 births
1944 deaths
English male hammer throwers
British male discus throwers
British male hammer throwers
English male discus throwers
Athletes (track and field) at the 1934 British Empire Games
Commonwealth Games silver medallists for England
Commonwealth Games medallists in athletics
York and Lancaster Regiment officers
British Army personnel killed in World War II
Medallists at the 1934 British Empire Games